Chuvash literature is literature written in the Chuvash language, regardless of the ethnic origin of the authors or the place of publication. This term applies to fictional works, but does not include folklore.

History
The Chuvash language is the only surviving member of the Oghur or Bulgar branch of the Turkic languages; therefore, Chuvash literature begins with ancient Turkic literature.

The oldest known Chuvash texts appear on the gravestones left by the Volga Bulgars in the 13th and 14th centuries in the Middle Volga region, during the rule of the Golden Horde. Most of the epitaphs on the tombstones were written in Oghur languages, of which Chuvash is the only extant member. While these epitaphs cannot be considered full-fledged literary works, they do record the Chuvash language of the Golden Horde. Even in their plain texts you can find a certain artistry, and in some instances there is even plot development.

18th century - Early 19th century
More artistic texts in the Chuvash languages began to appear in the 18th century, with the emergence of the Chuvash alphabet. For example, one poem by an anonymous writer in 1767 praised Catherine the Great, Empress of Russia:
Пелмастапар абирь тя минь барас парня,
Сана, чиберь патша, пора-мырынь Ання,
Jоратнышан пире. Пелмаста мар хальчен
Тора, хужу сюльда. Пельзан и дах чечень.
Памалых сяванжен, нимень сjок чон анчах, —
Парня вырня полдар вулда аппинь санах!

Translation: 

We do not know what to give 

You, beautiful queen, universal mother 

for the love of us. Did not know until now 

Goddess, which is in heaven. It turns out she is very elegant. 

We have nothing significant except our souls -

May they be a gift to you!

More than 10 similar Chuvash poems, mostly by unknown authors, have been identified. One of them, written in 1795 and dedicated to archbishop Ambrose, is usually attributed to Nikita Bichurin (1777-1853). E.I. Rozhanski (1741-1801), one of the founders of the original Chuvash alphabet, also wrote literature in Chuvash. For example, he translated the Short Catechism into the Chuvash language in 1800, which was the first book published in the Chuvash language. Another piece of Chuvash literature called "Chvash Aber Boldymyr", perhaps by V.I. Lebedev, dates to the same period (1852).

Late 19th century 
The current Chuvash alphabet (based on the Russian alphabet) was created in the early 1870s by IY Yakovlev, a great educator and social activist. During these years, there were works in the Chuvash language using this new alphabet. The highest achievement of the Chuvash literature of this period may be a poem by Mikhail Fedorov (1848-1904), titled Arzuri. It was written in 1884 and spread among the population, but was actually published much later, in 1908. During these years, Ignatius Ivanov (1848-1885) also wrote works of literature. He is best known as the author of a series of short stories entitled "How to Live Chuvash" Some of his creations have been published in the primer by I. Ya. Yakovlev, alongside many other works of Chuvash literature.

19th to 20th centuries (1886-1903) 
The formal starting point of this period is considered to be 1886, when Ivan Yurkin (1863-1943) began his literary career by writing his first short story. He became a large figure in the Chuvash culture and, in particular, in the realm of literature. Yurkin's major works of literature include "Wealth" and "The Man is Full, But His Eyes Were Hungry". He was also known as a journalist and an active defender of the traditional religion of the Chuvash.

Chuvash literature of the 20th century 
See also :Category:Chuvash writers

References

Literature 
 «Чӑваш литературин антологийӗ», составители: Д. В. Гордеев, Ю. А. Силэм. Шупашкар, 2003.  .
 Виталий Родионов, «Чӑваш литератури. XVIII—XIX ӗмӗрсем», Чебоксары, 2006. .
 Юхма Мишши, "Авалхи чӑвашсем, Чебоксары, 1996.

External links 
 История развития чувашской литературы/ The history of the Chuvash literature
 Культурное наследие Чувашии. Писатели/ Cultural heritage Chuvashia. Writers

Literature of Chuvashia
European literature